Touchmenot Mountain is a mountain located in the Catskill Mountains of New York southwest of Margaretville. Cross Mountain is located northeast of Touchmenot Mountain and Barkaboom Mountain is located northeast.

References

Mountains of Delaware County, New York
Mountains of New York (state)